Impure Blood (Nečista krv) is a Yugoslav historical drama filmed in 1991 and released in 1997.

Background
Impure Blood is an adaptation of the Nečista krv novel written by Borisav Stanković. It features Vranje local (and later political activist) Maja Stojanović and actor Rade Šerbedžija in the lead roles.

Cast 
Maja Stojanović (Sofka)
Rade Šerbedžija (Marko)
Tzvetana Maneva 
Meto Jovanovski (Agim)
Ljuba Tadić (Efendi Mito)
Filip Gajić (Tomča)
Neda Arnerić (Biljarica)

Tajna nečiste krvi
The project was originally a combined adaptation of two Borisav Stanković novels: Nečista krv and Koštana. Turbo-folk singer Ceca was cast as the Roma girl Koštana. However, due to some conflicts, the film could be released years after it was filmed and covering only one of the novels. By 2011, Serbian television network Happy TV bought the entire footage of the film and, starting from 1 January 2012, it was aired as a 12-episode miniseries under the title Tajna nečiste krvi (The Secret of the Impure Blood).

References

External links
 

1990s Serbian-language films
1997 films
Yugoslav historical drama films
Films set in Serbia
Films set in the 1890s
1990s historical drama films
Serbian historical drama films
1997 drama films